The 2019 Artsakh Football League is the 2nd official professional season of the Artsakh Football League. It started on the March 9th, 2019 and is composed of twelve clubs which will compete for the title.

Participants  

Twelve teams will take part in this year's competition. No team was relegated in the previous season, but 4 more were added this year.

Clubs

League table

Results
The league will be played in two stages, one home and one away, for a total of 22 matches played per team.

References

Art
Artsakh Football League, 2019